is a 1968 Japanese drama film directed by Kei Kumai. It was Japan's submission to the 41st Academy Awards for the Academy Award for Best Foreign Language Film, but was not accepted as a nominee. Produced by its stars Toshiro Mifune and Yujiro Ishihara, the film's first run in cinemas lasted for a month, significantly longer than the week or ten days that films at that time usually ran in Japan.

Cast
 Toshiro Mifune as Kitagawa
 Yujiro Ishihara as Iwaoka
 Osamu Takizawa as Otagaki
 Takashi Shimura as Ashimura
 Shūji Sano as Hirata
 Jūkichi Uno as Mori
 Ryūtarō Tatsumi as Genzō
 Isao Tamagawa as Sayama
 Takeshi Katō as Kunikida
 Sumio Takatsu as Ōno
 Tappie Shimokawa
 Asao Sano
 Mizuho Suzuki as Senda
 Eijirō Yanagi as Fujimura
 Akira Yamanouchi as Tsukamoto
 Masao Shimizu as Tayama
 Hideaki Nitani as Odagiri

See also
List of submissions to the 41st Academy Awards for Best Foreign Language Film
List of Japanese submissions for the Academy Award for Best Foreign Language Film

References

External links

1968 films
1968 drama films
Japanese drama films
1960s Japanese-language films
Films directed by Kei Kumai
Films produced by Toshiro Mifune
1960s Japanese films